Slovak partisans were fighters in irregular military groups participating in the Slovak resistance movement, including against Nazi Germany and collaborationism during World War II.

Beginning

Slovak partisans were an anti-fascist militia formed immediately the creation of the First Slovak Republic in 1939, to fight against Nazis and their collaborators. Men and women both fought in the ranks of partisan units, as well as Jews and Christians alike. Slovak partisans had mixed loyalties as many were deeply nationalistic and wanted a to maintain an independent Slovak Republic free of fascism, while many others were socialists who forged strong links with the Soviet Union and Soviet partisans. Slovak partisans mainly carried out acts of sabotage. Their largest anti-Nazi military engagement was the Slovak National Uprising in 1944, in which Slovak partisans were aided by the Slovak Army and Soviet partisans. Jan Golian and Rudolf Viest, generals in the Slovak Army, led the uprising, which was eventually crushed by the Germans and their Hungarian, Slovak and Ukrainian collaborators. The most famous Slovak partisan brigade was the M.R.Stefanik brigade led by the Slovak partisan hero Viliam Zingor. With 1300 members, it was the largest partisan brigade, and was fiercely nationalistic yet religiously tolerant, with over 300 Jewish members. After the war this brigade, and its leader, fell into disfavour among Czechoslovak Communist politicians, who accused Gustáv Husák of being a traitor to the Slovak nation and people. Zingor was eventually executed by Husák and the communist government on the December 18, 1950. The Janosik brigade was another partisan brigade, which fought in the Tatra Mountains and Orava.

Jewish brigades
Slovak Jewish partisans made outstanding accomplishments as members of all-Jewish groups. The most famous Slovak Jewish partisan unit was the Novaky Brigade, formed from the inmates of Novaky concentration camp. The Novaky brigade benefited from its strategic locale, as the camp was in a region populated by miners and farmers who had no sympathy for the pro-Nazi government. With the help of these friendly locals, the Novaky brigade made contacts with other partisans, and arranged to receive aid and weapons in the event of an armed uprising. In honour of their service to their country, 166 Jewish partisans were awarded the Order of the Slovak Uprising.

Famous partisans
Martin Petrasek
Rudolf Vrba
Ján Nálepka
Viliam Zingor
Emil Perko
Karol Adler
Haviva Reik
Ludovit Kukorelli
Jan Fedak
Viola Valachova
Katarina Chutkova
Jan Kovac
Zelma Steiner
Egon Roth
Jan Usiak
Michal Pavlovic
Milos Uher

References

Further reading

See also
Partisan Congress riots
Slovak National Uprising
Central National Revolutionary Committee

 
Paramilitary organizations based in Czechoslovakia